Huli Hebbuli is a 1987 Kannada-language action film directed by Vijay and written by Shanmuga Sundaram. The film starred Shankar Nag, Tiger Prabhakar, Sumalatha and Bhavya and Anant Nag in an extended special appearance. The film was produced by B. Nagi Reddy. The film's score and  songs were composed by Vijaya Bhaskar to the lyrics of Chi. Udaya Shankar. The cinematography was by S. Ramachandra. The director remade the movie in Hindi in 1988 as Ganga Tere Desh Mein.

Cast 

 Tiger Prabhakar
 Shankar Nag
Bhavya
Anant Nag in Special Appearance
 Sumalatha
Leelavathi
 Disco Shanthi
 Sundar Krishna Urs
 N. S. Rao
 Umesh
 Master Manjunath
 Dingri Nagaraj
 Mandeep Roy

Soundtrack 
The music was composed by Vijaya Bhaskar with lyrics by Chi. Udaya Shankar.

References

External links 
 

1987 films
1980s Kannada-language films
Indian action films
Films scored by Vijaya Bhaskar
1987 action films
Kannada films remade in other languages
Films directed by Vijay (director)